Joseph Francis Dunford Jr. ,  (born December 23, 1955) is a retired United States Marine Corps four-star general who served as the 19th chairman of the Joint Chiefs of Staff from October 1, 2015 to September 30, 2019. He was the 36th commandant of the Marine Corps. Dunford is the first Marine Corps officer to serve in four different four-star positions; the others include commander of the International Security Assistance Force and United States Forces – Afghanistan from February 2013 to August 2014, and as the 32nd Assistant Commandant of the Marine Corps from October 23, 2010 to December 15, 2012. He has commanded several units, including the 5th Marine Regiment during the 2003 invasion of Iraq.

Early life and education
Dunford was born in Boston on December 23, 1955, and raised in Quincy, Massachusetts. His father served as an enlisted Marine in the Korean War. He is an Irish Catholic, and Red Sox fan. 

He graduated from Boston College High School in 1973, and from Saint Michael's College in June 1977. He earned his commission the month of his college graduation. He is a graduate of the United States Army War College, Ranger School, United States Army Airborne School, and the Amphibious Warfare School. He holds a Master of Arts degree in government from Georgetown University and a second Master of Arts degree in international relations from the Fletcher School of Law and Diplomacy at Tufts University.

Military career

In 1978, Dunford served in the 1st Marine Division as a platoon and company commander in 3rd Battalion 1st Marines and a company commander in 1st Battalion 9th Marines until 1981. He served as the aide to the commanding general of III Marine Expeditionary Force, Stephen G. Olmstead, for a year, then transferred to the Officer Assignment Branch at Headquarters Marine Corps in Washington, D.C. He reported to the 2nd Marine Division in June 1985 and commanded L Company of 3rd Battalion 6th Marines. In 1987, he was reassigned to 2nd Air Naval Gunfire Liaison Company as the Operations, Plans, and Training Officer.

From 1988 to 1991, Dunford was assigned as the Marine Officer Instructor at the College of the Holy Cross and Officer Candidates School at Marine Corps Base Quantico. In 1992, he was assigned to HQMC as a member of the Commandant's staff group and subsequently as the Senior Aide to the Commandant of the Marine Corps. In 1995, he joined the 6th Marine Regiment as the executive officer, then went on to command 2nd Battalion 6th Marines from 1996 until 1998.

In 1999, Dunford was the Executive Assistant to the Vice Chairman of the Joint Chiefs of Staff (under both Generals Joseph Ralston and Richard Myers) and as Chief, Global and Multilateral Affairs Division (J-5) until 2001. He next served in the 1st Marine Division where he was assigned to command the 5th Marine Regiment, then as the division's chief of staff and assistant commander. During this time, he served 22 months in Iraq. During his command of RCT-5 in the 2003 invasion of Iraq, he earned the nickname "Fighting Joe" under James Mattis.

From 2005 to 2007, Dunford returned to Headquarters Marine Corps to serve as the Director of the Operations Division of the Plans, Policies and Operations staff, and eventually became the Vice Director for Operations (J-3) at the Joint Staff in 2008. In December 2007, Dunford was nominated for promotion to the rank of major general. Two months later, Secretary of Defense Robert Gates announced that President George W. Bush had nominated Dunford for promotion to lieutenant general and appointment as Deputy Commandant for Plans, Policies and Operations, to succeed Lieutenant General Richard F. Natonski. In April 2008, his appointment to the permanent rank of major general was confirmed by the United States Senate, and he was simultaneously appointed to the grade of lieutenant general for his new assignment.

On May 1, 2009, the Pentagon announced that President Barack Obama had appointed Dunford to serve as the commanding general of I Marine Expeditionary Force and Marine Forces Central Command.

Less than a year into that assignment, Dunford was nominated by Secretary of Defense Robert Gates to succeed James F. Amos as Assistant Commandant of the Marine Corps, who had been nominated to succeed James Conway as Commandant. President Obama approved his promotion and Dunford assumed the duties and new rank on October 23, 2010.

On October 10, 2012, Dunford was nominated by President Obama to lead U.S. and NATO forces in Afghanistan. Dunford assumed command of the International Security Assistance Force and U.S. Forces Afghanistan (USFOR-A) from General John Allen on February 10, 2013.

On June 5, 2014, Dunford was nominated by President Obama to be the 36th Commandant of the Marine Corps. His nomination was confirmed by the Senate on July 23, 2014, and he became Commandant on October 17, 2014. On January 23, 2015, Dunford released the 36th Commandant's Planning Guidance.

During his tenure, Dunford worked to keep sex-based job assignment policies in place to keep women out of ground combat arms military occupational specialties. On December 3, 2015, Dunford was overruled by Secretary of Defense Ash Carter who announced that beginning in January 2016, all military occupations and positions will be open to women, without exception.

Chairman of the Joint Chiefs of Staff

President Barack Obama nominated Dunford to be the next Chairman of the Joint Chiefs of Staff on May 5, 2015. He was confirmed by the U.S. Senate, and took over from Army General Martin Dempsey on September 25, 2015, and officially took office on October 1, 2015. He serves with General Paul Selva, USAF, former Commander of U.S. Transportation Command, who is the current Vice Chairman of the Joint Chiefs of Staff. Dunford is the only Marine to have served as Assistant Commandant of the Marine Corps, Commandant of the Marine Corps, and Chairman of the Joint Chiefs of Staff. He was nominated for a second term as chairman by President Donald Trump on May 16, 2017. His renomination was approved by the Senate on September 27, 2017.

During an event in December 2018, Joseph Dunford criticized Google for its "inexplicable" continued investing in autocratic, communist-led China while simultaneously not renewing further research and development collaborations with the Pentagon. "I'm not sure that people at Google will enjoy a world order that is informed by the norms and standards of Russia or China," Dunford said. Dunford has urged that Google should work directly with the U.S. government instead of making controversial inroads into China.

Dunford stepped down as chairman of the Joint Chiefs of Staff on September 30, 2019, declining interviews and praising his successor, General Mark A. Milley. Dunford and Secretary of Defense Jim Mattis had favored Air Force chief of staff General David L. Goldfein as Dunford's successor, but Milley was selected by President Donald Trump instead. Dunford officially retired on 1 November 2019.

Effective dates of promotion

* Appointed to Lieutenant General and confirmed by the United States Senate in April 2008. Simultaneously, he was appointed Deputy Commandant for Plans, Policies and Operations, skipping the rank of Major General. For administrative purposes, his promotion to permanent major general and lieutenant general are on the same date.

Awards and decorations
Dunford is the recipient of the following awards:

He also earned the U.S. Army Ranger tab.

Civilian awards
On April 6, 2016, Dunford was honored with the Tragedy Assistance Program for Survivors (TAPS) "Honor Guard Gala Military Award", which he received "on Behalf of America's Armed Forces". On September 8, 2016, Dunford received the Heroes Award from nonprofit organization Tuesday's Children at their annual Roots of Resilience Gala. He accepted it on behalf of the men and women of the Armed Forces. On July 23, 2018, Dunford received the coveted "Dwight D. Eisenhower" award during a ceremony from the VFW (Veterans of Foreign Wars). On May 10, 2019, he received the same award from the National Defense Industrial Association. On December 7, 2018, Dunford received the Andrew J. Goodpaster award from the George C. Marshall Foundation.

Dunford was awarded the title of Honorary Officer of the Order of Australia (AO) in the Military Division in 2018. He also received Canada's Meritorious Service Cross (MSC) in the Military Division that same year, and accepted the award at the Halifax International Security Forum. In 2020 he was made an Honorary Knight Commander of the Most Excellent Order of the British Empire (KBE) in the Military Division. While, as an honorary knight, he may not use the title of Sir, he retains the right to use post-nominals for any Commonwealth awards.

A street in Quincy Center in Dunford's childhood hometown of Quincy, Massachusetts, was named "General Joseph F. Dunford Drive" in his honor in 2021. Seven general officers from Quincy, including Dunford, were honored with the construction of a public park in Quincy Center, as well as a bridge connecting Quincy Center to the Thomas E. Burgin Parkway. The Generals Park was dedicated in September 2021, and the Generals Bridge opened to traffic in January 2022.

Civilian career 
As of February 10, 2020, Dunford joined the board of directors at Lockheed Martin, serving on the Classified Business and Security Committee and Nominating and Corporate Governance Committee. He is also on the board of a New York private equity firm, following a path taken by other prominent retired 4-star officers, such as David Petraeus (who went to work for the global investment firm KKR) and Ray Odierno (who became a senior advisor at JPMorgan Chase). In May 2022, he joined the board of directors at Satellogic, an Argentine satellite company.

See also

List of United States Marine Corps four-star generals

References

External links

 

|-

|-

|-

|-

|-

|-

|-

1955 births
American people of Irish descent
United States Marine Corps personnel of the Iraq War
United States Marine Corps personnel of the War in Afghanistan (2001–2021)
Boston College High School alumni
Catholics from Massachusetts
Chairmen of the Joint Chiefs of Staff
Georgetown University Graduate School of Arts and Sciences alumni
Honorary Knights Commander of the Order of the British Empire
Knights Commander of the Order of Merit of the Federal Republic of Germany
Living people
People from Boston
People from Quincy, Massachusetts
Military personnel from Massachusetts
Recipients of the Defense Distinguished Service Medal
Recipients of the Defense Superior Service Medal
Recipients of the Legion of Merit
Recipients of the Navy Distinguished Service Medal
Saint Michael's College alumni
The Fletcher School at Tufts University alumni
United States Marine Corps generals
Recipients of the Darjah Utama Bakti Cemerlang (Tentera)
Grand Officers of the Order of Merit of the Italian Republic
United States Marine Corps Commandants
Honorary Officers of the Order of Australia
Grand Cordons of the Order of the Rising Sun